Eric Jay Paul Dungey (born June 12, 1996) is an American football quarterback for the DC Defenders of the XFL. He played college football at Syracuse.

Early years 
Dungey attended Lakeridge High School in Lake Oswego, Oregon. As a senior, he threw for 2395 yards and 22 touchdowns. He was a three-star recruit and committed to Syracuse University to play college football.

College career 
Dungey played eight games in 2015, completing 105 of 176 passes for 1298 yards and 11 touchdowns. He suffered a concussion in game 3 of his freshman season.

During his sophomore season in 2016, Dungey completed 230 of 355 passes for 2679 yards with 15 touchdowns in nine games before suffering a season-ending head injury.

During his junior year in 2017, Dungey completed 225 of 377 passes for 2495 yards and 14 touchdowns in nine games. He threw for 276 yards and 3 touchdowns in an upset victory over No. 2 Clemson. He later suffered a season-ending leg injury against Florida State.

During his senior year in 2018, he completed 226 of 371 passes for 2868 yards, 18 touchdowns, and nine interceptions. During the 2018 Camping World Bowl, he threw for 303 yards and a touchdown against West Virginia and won MVP. He broke a school record previously held by Ryan Nassib for most passing yards in a career during the bowl game.

College statistics 

Source:

Professional career

New York Giants
Following the conclusion of the 2019 NFL Draft, Dungey signed with the New York Giants as an undrafted free agent on May 2, 2019. He was listed on the Giants roster as a quarterback and a tight end. He was waived on July 24, 2019.

Cleveland Browns
On October 11, 2019, Dungey was signed to the Cleveland Browns practice squad. He was released by the Browns on December 19, 2019.

Dallas Renegades 
On January 8, 2020, Dungey was assigned to the Dallas Renegades of the XFL following an injury to quarterback Landry Jones. On February 11, 2020, he was placed on the reserve/left squad list for personal reasons. He was activated from the left squad list on February 19, 2020. He was placed on the reserve/left squad list again on February 24, 2020, after the death of his father. He was activated again on March 2, 2020. He had his contract terminated when the league suspended operations on April 10, 2020.

Cincinnati Bengals
On May 14, 2021, Dungey signed with the Cincinnati Bengals. He was waived on August 22, 2021.

DC Defenders
On November 15, 2022, Dungey was assigned to the DC Defenders of the XFL.

Personal life
His father, Tim, was diagnosed with cancer in May 2019. New York businessman Adam Weitsman sold his suite for the Syracuse vs Clemson game in 2019 to raise money for Dungey's father. Tim Dungey died on February 21, 2020.

References

External links 
 Syracuse Orange bio
 New York Giants bio

1996 births
Living people
American football quarterbacks
Cincinnati Bengals players
Cleveland Browns players
Dallas Renegades players
DC Defenders players
New York Giants players
Players of American football from Oregon
Sportspeople from Lake Oswego, Oregon
Syracuse Orange football players